Zona Rosa (Spanish: "pink zone") is a term used in Latin American countries to refer to a district that is the center of a town or city's nightlife. It may refer to:

Places
 Zona Rosa, Mexico City, a neighborhood in Mexico City
 Zona Rosa (San Salvador), the entertainment district of San Salvador, El Salvador
 Zona Rosa (Kansas City, Missouri), a shopping district in Kansas City, Missouri
 Zona Rosa, Bogotá, a neighborhood in the northern part of Bogotá, Colombia; see Chapinero

Other
 Zona Rosa, a character in the novel Idoru by William Gibson